"Lady of Spain" is a popular song composed in 1931 by Tolchard Evans with lyrics by "Erell Reaves", a pseudonym of Stanley J. Damerell and Robert Hargreaves (1894–1934)I, and by Henry Tilsley. The sheet music was published in London by the Peter Maurice Music Company and in New York by the Sam Fox Publishing Company.

Performance
The earliest recordings of this song were sung by Al Bowlly and Tino Folgar, recorded in 1931 (the year the song was written). Bowlly made recordings with both Ray Noble's and Roy Fox's orchestras. In 1949, Noble's 1931 recording was reissued, with Bowlly's original vocal replaced by a dubbed-in vocal trio, and the record reached No. 19 in the Billboard charts. Bowlly had died in the intervening period.

A recording by Eddie Fisher with Hugo Winterhalter and his orchestra was made at Manhattan Center, New York City, on July 18, 1952. It was released by RCA Victor Records as catalog number 20-4953 (in USA) and by EMI on the His Master's Voice label as catalog number B 10362. It was a hit in the US, reaching the No. 6 position in the Billboard charts.

Les Paul's guitar instrumental on Capitol Records also reached the Billboard charts, with a peak position of No. 8.

The song was also covered by Bing Crosby

The song is often played on the accordion. Starting in 1947, Dick Contino popularized the song in a Horace Heidt–Philip Morris series of talent contests. This was the theme song of Myron Floren, the accordionist on The Lawrence Welk Show.

Accordionist and composer William Schimmel performs his own concert version (Reality) of "Lady of Spain" with a series of far-fetched variations on his solo CD Lady of Spain and Other Realities (Newport Classic Records).

In popular culture
The song was also featured in the TV version of Jeeves and Wooster as one of the few songs that the band, featuring some of the members of the Drones Club, actually know. They went on to perform this in several locations as negro minstrels; in one scene, Hugh Laurie (as Bertie Wooster, hiding from the father of an erstwhile fiancée), performed as their vocalist.

In his novel Gravity's Rainbow, Thomas Pynchon references the song.  It is mentioned briefly in the description of a party being held by Lieutenant Slothrop.

In the season 3 episode of I Love Lucy titled "Ricky's 'Life' Story" (1953), "Lady of Spain" is sung by Ricky Ricardo (played by Desi Arnaz).

The song was also featured in the 1977 film Slap Shot, where player/coach Reggie Dunlop (played by Paul Newman) tears up the organist's music and tells him "Don't ever play 'Lady Of Spain' again!" This line is still popular today in several teams' arenas, where the fans will respond with Newman's line if "Lady Of Spain" is played during the game.

"Lady of Spain" was performed by Marvin Suggs on his Muppaphone on The Muppet Show and appears on the Muppet Show 25th anniversary compilation The Muppet Show: Music, Mayhem, and More.

In the popular British sitcom 'Allo 'Allo, in the episode "All in Disgeese", M. Alfonse plays "Lady of Spain" on the accordion.

The appearance of a reigning Lady of Spain is part of Cotati, California's, annual Cotati Accordion Festival since 1990.

Bibliography

Annotations

Notes

References

 

  .

 
 

 

 
 Al Bowlly, vocalist on side A.
 Howard Phillips, vocalist on side B.
 
 
 

 

  ; .

 

  ; ; .
 
 
 
 
 
 

   ; ; .

External links
"My Uncle wrote Lady of Spain" by Ian Whitcomb

1931 songs
Pop standards
Songs written by Tolchard Evans
Al Bowlly songs